Mau Mau Island, also called White Island, is a small uninhabited island in the New York City borough of Brooklyn, located between Gerritsen Creek and Mill Creek in the Marine Park recreation area. Historically, the area around Mau Mau Island was a salt marsh with shifting topography. The island came into existence permanently sometime after 1917, and most likely formed in 1934 as dumping led to the current shoreline.

The area was uninhabited by European settlers until the late 1700s, when a mill and bridge were built. It was donated to the City of New York in the early 1930s, along with much of Marine Park, by Alfred Tredway White and Frederic Pratt with the requirement that it become parkland.

In the 1930s, sand excavated during construction of the Belt Parkway was added to the island. Subsequently, patches of asphalt were laid on top to prevent the sand from blowing onto the nearby Marine Park Golf Course.

In 2011, the New York City Parks Department began a restoration project on the island, with the goal of restoring salt marsh and bird habitat.

Notes

References

Uninhabited islands of New York (state)
Islands of Brooklyn
Islands of New York City
Marine Park, Brooklyn